Seona is a village in the  Banovici municipality, Tuzla Canton, Federation of Bosnia and Herzegovina, Bosnia and Herzegovina.

References

Populated places in Bosnia and Herzegovina